= Nitin Madhukar Nandgaonkar =

Indian politician

Nitin Nandgaonkar

Personal details
- Born: 18 August 1969 (age 56) Chembur, Mumbai, Maharashtra
- Party: Shiv Sena
- Spouse: Anushree Nitin Nandgaonkar
- Children: Devraj Nandgaonkar
- Parent: Madhukar Nandgaonkar (father)
- Occupation: Politician

Nitin Madhukar Nandgaonkar is an Indian politician with the Shiv Sena party in Maharashtra.

Nandgaonkar was earlier member of the Maharashtra Navnirman Sena, and held position of the General Secretary of Vahatuk Sena. He started his political career with the Shiv Sena.
